Francis Bird (14 November 1845 24 May 1937) was a businessman and architect in Western Australia. Bird was born in Hyde Park in London, the third son of Mr and Mrs George Bird of Pinner Hall, Middlesex.

Once settled he set up a business partnership with timber merchant Benjamin Mason named Mason, Bird and Co.

In 1877 he relinquished his milling interests and settled in Perth to practice as an architect. Eventually appointed as Chief Government Architect in 1883 he remained in the position until 1884. By 1889 he moved to Albany and took up residence at Old Farm, Strawberry Hill where he remained for the rest of his life. Bird stood unsuccessfully for the seat of Albany at the 1890 general election, losing by a large margin to Lancel de Hamel.

References

1845 births
1937 deaths
People from Albany, Western Australia
Architects from Western Australia
Settlers of Western Australia
English emigrants to Australia